Bruno Zaremba (7 April 1955 – 5 November 2018) was a French professional footballer who played as a striker for Valenciennes, Metz, Dunkerque and Arras.

Personal life 
His younger brother Pascal was also a footballer.

References

1955 births
2018 deaths
French footballers
Valenciennes FC players
FC Metz players
USL Dunkerque players
Arras FA players
Ligue 2 players
Ligue 1 players
Championnat National players
Championnat National 2 players
Association football forwards
Sportspeople from Nord (French department)
Footballers from Hauts-de-France